Scinet may refer to:
 SCinet, high-performance network built annually at the International Conference for High Performance Computing and Communications
 SciNet Consortium, Canadian consortium for high-performance computing